The Margaret River is a river in southwest Western Australia. In a small catchment, it is the eponym of the town and tourist region of Margaret River.

The river arises from a catchment of just 40 square kilometres in the Whicher Range. Ombak tujuh is a "big-wave" spot.

The middle reaches pass through land cleared for agriculture, especially viticulture.

There is a weir across the river just above the town. The mouth of the river is a small estuary, closed to the ocean by a sandbar that opens only seasonally.

Margaret River is presumed to be named after Margaret Wyche, cousin of John Garrett Bussell (founder of Busselton) in 1832.

See also
Margaret River (wine region)

Notes

References
 

Rivers of the South West region
Margaret River, Western Australia